Craig Johnson is an American former professional tennis player.

Johnson, who played collegiate tennis at Pepperdine University for four years, reached a best singles world ranking of 318 on the professional tour. His only ATP Tour main draw appearance came in doubles at the 1990 OTB International Open in Schenectady. He featured in singles qualifying at Wimbledon during his career and won two qualifying matches at the 1991 Australian Open, including against future finalist Thomas Enqvist.

ATP Challenger finals

Doubles: 1 (0–1)

References

External links
 
 

Year of birth missing (living people)
Living people
American male tennis players
Pepperdine Waves men's tennis players
People from Boonton, New Jersey
Sportspeople from Morris County, New Jersey
Tennis people from New Jersey